Joseph Jacob Foss (April 17, 1915January 1, 2003) was a United States Marine Corps major and a leading Marine fighter ace in World War II. He received the Medal of Honor in recognition of his role in air combat during the Guadalcanal Campaign. In postwar years, he was an Air National Guard brigadier general, served as the 20th Governor of South Dakota (1955–1959), president of the National Rifle Association (NRA) and the first commissioner of the American Football League. He also was a television broadcaster.

Early years
Foss was born in an unelectrified farmhouse near Sioux Falls, South Dakota, the oldest son of Mary Esther (née Lacey) and Frank Ole Foss. He was of Norwegian and Scottish descent. At age 12, he visited an airfield in Renner to see Charles Lindbergh on tour with his aircraft, the Spirit of St. Louis. Four years later, he and his father paid $1.50 apiece to take their first aircraft ride in a Ford Trimotor at Black Hills Airport with a famed South Dakota aviator, Clyde Ice.

In March 1933, while coming back from the fields during a storm, his father was killed when he drove over a downed electrical cable and was electrocuted as he stepped out of his automobile. Young Foss, not yet 18 years old, pitched in with his mother and brother Cliff to continue running the family farm. Farming was made difficult by dust storms, which over the next two years took its toll on crops and livestock.

After watching a Marine Corps aerial team, led by Capt. Clayton Jerome, perform aerobatics in open-cockpit biplanes, he was determined to become a Marine aviator. Foss worked at a service station to pay for books and college tuition, and to begin flight lessons from Roy Lanning, at the Sioux Skyway Airfield in 1938, scraping up $65 to pay for the instruction. His younger brother took over the management of the farm and allowed Foss to go back to school and graduate from Washington High School in Sioux Falls. He graduated from the University of South Dakota in 1939 with a degree in business administration.

While at USD, Foss and other like-minded students convinced authorities to set up a CAA flying course at the university; he built up 100 flight hours by graduation. Foss paid his way through university by "bussing" tables. He joined the Sigma chapter of the Sigma Alpha Epsilon fraternity and excelled at sports in USD, fighting on the college boxing team, participating as a member of the track team and as a second-string guard on the football team.

Foss served as a Private in the 147th Field Artillery Regiment, Sioux Falls, South Dakota National Guard from 1939 to 1940. By 1940, armed with a pilot certificate and a college degree, Foss hitchhiked to Minneapolis to enlist in the Marine Corps Reserves, in order to join the Naval Aviation Cadet program to become a Naval Aviator.

Military career

Effort to become a fighter pilot
After being designated a Naval Aviator, Foss graduated at Pensacola, Florida and was commissioned as a second lieutenant, then served as a "plowback" instructor at Naval Air Station Pensacola. At 27 years of age, he was considered too old to be a fighter pilot, and was instead sent to the Navy School of Photography. Upon completion of his initial assignment, he was transferred to Marine Photographic Squadron 1 (VMO-1) stationed at Naval Air Station North Island in San Diego, California. Dissatisfied with his role in photographic reconnaissance, Foss made repeated requests to be transferred to a fighter qualification program. He checked out in Grumman F4F Wildcats while still assigned to VMO-1, logging over 150 flight hours in June and July, 1942, and was eventually transferred to Marine Fighting Squadron 121 VMF-121 as the executive officer. While stateside, Foss married his high school sweetheart, June Shakstad in 1942.

Guadalcanal Flying Ace
In October 1942, VMF-121 pilots and aircraft were sent to Guadalcanal as part of Operation Watchtower to relieve VMF-223, which had been fighting for control of the air over the island since mid-August. The air group, code named "Cactus", based at Henderson Field became known as the Cactus Air Force, and their presence played a pivotal role in the Battle of Guadalcanal. Foss soon gained a reputation for aggressive close-in fighter tactics and uncanny gunnery skills. Foss shot down a Japanese Zero on his first combat mission on October 13, but his own F4F Wildcat was shot up as well, and with a dead engine and three more Zeros on his tail, he landed at full speed, with no flaps and minimal control on Henderson Field, barely missing a grove of palm trees. On 7 November his Wildcat was again hit, and he survived a ditching in the sea off the island of Malaita.

As lead pilot in his flight of eight Wildcats, the group soon became known as "Foss's Flying Circus", with two sections Foss nicknamed "Farm Boys" and "City Slickers." In December 1942, Foss contracted malaria. He was sent to Sydney, Australia for rehabilitation, where he met Australian ace Clive "Killer" Caldwell and delivered some lectures on operational flying to RAF pilots, newly assigned to the theater. On January 1, 1943, Foss returned to Guadalcanal, to continue combat operations which lasted until February 9, 1943, although the Japanese attacks had waned from the height of the November 1942 crisis. In three months of sustained combat, Foss's Flying Circus had shot down 72 Japanese aircraft, including 26 credited to him. Upon matching the record of 26 kills held by America's top World War I ace, Eddie Rickenbacker, Foss was accorded the honor of becoming America's first "ace-of-aces" in World War II. One of the Japanese he shot down was ace Kaname Harada, who became a peace activist and met Foss many years later.

Foss returned to the United States in March 1943. On May 18, 1943, Foss received the Medal of Honor from President Franklin Delano Roosevelt. The White House ceremony was featured in Life magazine, with the reluctant Captain Foss appearing on the magazine's cover. He then was asked to participate in a war bond tour that stretched into 1944.

Return to combat

In February 1944, Foss returned to the Pacific theater to lead VMF-115, flying the F4U Corsair. VMF-115 was based in the combat zone around Emirau, St. Mathias Group in 1944. It was during this second tour that Foss met and became friends with fellow Marine fighter ace Marion Carl. He also had an opportunity to meet and fly with his boyhood idol, Charles Lindbergh, who was on assignment touring the South Pacific as an aviation consultant. After eight months of operational flying but no opportunities to increase his wartime score, Foss finished his combat service as one of America's top scoring pilots.

Foss again contracted malaria, and was sent home to the Klamath Falls, Oregon Rehabilitation Center. In February 1945, he became operations and training officer at the Marine Corps Air Station Santa Barbara, California.

Postwar

Air National Guard
In August 1945, Foss was released to inactive duty and opened Joe Foss Flying Service, charter flying service and flight instruction school in Sioux Falls, that eventually grew into a 35-aircraft operation. With a friend, Duane "Duke" Corning, he later owned a Packard car dealership in the town.

In October 1945, Foss was ordered to appear at Navy Day ceremonies in four cities there and was finally relieved from active duty in December 1945 but was retained in the Marine Corps Reserve on inactive duty until 1947. In 1946, Foss was appointed a lieutenant colonel in the South Dakota Air National Guard and instructed to form the South Dakota Air National Guard, becoming the commanding officer for the Guard's 175th Fighter-Interceptor Squadron. During the unit's formative years, Foss was actively involved in administration and flying with the squadron, even becoming a member of their North American P-51 Mustang air demonstration team. During the Korean War, Foss, then a colonel, was called to active duty with the United States Air Force, relinquishing command of the 175th Squadron, and served as a Director of Operations and Training for the Central Air Defense Command; he eventually reached the rank of brigadier general.

Political career

Campaigning from the cockpit of a light aircraft, Foss served two elected terms as a Republican representative in the South Dakota legislature and, beginning in 1955, at age 39, as the state's youngest governor. During his tenure as governor, he accompanied Tom Brokaw, then a high school student and Governor of South Dakota American Legion Boys State, to New York City for a joint appearance on "Two for the Money", a television game show, which featured Foss because of his wartime celebrity.  Foss had previously appeared on the long-running game show What's My Line on May 1, 1955. 

In 1958, Foss unsuccessfully sought a seat in the U.S. House of Representatives, having been defeated by another wartime pilot hero, the Democrat George McGovern. Foss tried to re-enter politics in 1962 in a campaign to succeed Sen. Francis Case, who died in office. Foss and several other contenders lost to Joseph H. Bottum, who filled out Case's term.

Later careers

American Football League
After serving as governor, Foss spent a short time working for Raven Industries before becoming the first Commissioner of the newly created American Football League in 1959. He oversaw the emergence of the league as the genesis of modern professional football. During the next seven years, Foss helped expand the league and made lucrative television deals, including the initial five-year, $10.6 million contract with ABC in 1960 to broadcast AFL games. The next contract was also for five years, but with NBC for a substantially greater $36 million, starting in 1965.

Foss stepped aside as commissioner in April 1966, two months before the historic agreement that led to the merger of AFL and NFL and the creation of the Super Bowl. Al Davis succeeded him, but disagreed with the merger and resigned after  months. Milt Woodard, the assistant commissioner under Foss, was named to the new office of president of the AFL in July and served through the league's final season in 1969.

Television career
Drawing on a lifelong love of hunting and the outdoors, Foss hosted ABC television's The American Sportsman from 1964 to 1967, which took him around the world for hunting and fishing excursions. He then hosted and produced his own syndicated outdoors TV series, The Outdoorsman: Joe Foss, from 1967 to 1974. In 1972, he also began a six-year stint as Director of Public Affairs for KLM Royal Dutch Airlines.

National Rifle Association
Starting in 1988, Foss was elected to two consecutive one-year terms as president of the National Rifle Association. In his later years he maintained a rigorous speaking schedule and spoke out for conservative causes on what he considered a weakening of gun owners' rights. He was portrayed on the cover of the 29 January 1990 issue of Time Magazine wearing his trademark Stetson hat and holding a revolver.

Philanthropy
Foss, who had a daughter with cerebral palsy, served as President of the National Society of Crippled Children and Adults. Foss's other charities included the Easter Seals campaign, Campus Crusade for Christ, and an Arizona program for disadvantaged youths.

The Joe Foss Institute
In 2001, Foss and his second wife, "Didi," founded the Joe Foss Institute, a 501(c)(3) nonprofit organization. The institute works with veterans and educators around the United States to educate the nation's youth on history and civics, and to inspire them to become informed and engaged citizens. Through classroom presentations, curriculum and scholarships, the Joe Foss Institute has served more than 1.35 million children, as of June 2014, nationwide. Currently, the institute offers three primary programs; Veterans Inspiring Patriotism (VIP), You are America Civics Series and scholarship contests which run year-round. Foss did many of these school visits himself, speaking to children of all ages about service, responsibility, patriotism, integrity and commitment.

Other honors and recognition
Foss co-authored or was the subject of three books including the wartime Joe Foss: Flying Marine (with Walter Simmons); Top Guns (with Matthew Brennan); and A Proud American by his wife, Donna Wild Foss. Foss also provided the foreword to Above and Beyond: the Aviation Medals of Honor by Barrett Tillman, and was profiled in Tom Brokaw's 1998 book about World War II and its warriors, The Greatest Generation. Brokaw characterized Foss: "He had a hero's swagger but a winning smile to go with his plain talk and movie-star looks. Joe Foss was larger than life, and his heroics in the skies over the Pacific were just the beginning of a journey that would take him to places far from that farm with no electricity and not much hope north of Sioux Falls."Brave Eagle, a 1955 postwar effort to film a story of Foss's life, starring his friend, John Wayne, fell through in 1956 when Foss refused to allow the producers to add a fictitious love story. American Ace: The Joe Foss Story was an award-winning, hour-length television documentary, produced by the South Dakota Public Broadcasting, first aired in fall 2006.

Foss was inducted into the National Aviation Hall of Fame in 1984. He also was a president and board chairman of the Air Force Association and as a Director of the United States Air Force Academy. In 2000, he served as a consultant on the popular computer game Combat Flight Simulator 2 by Microsoft. A complete listing of Foss's affiliations and honors is given at The Joe Foss Institute.

Later years

On January 11, 2002, Foss, then 86, was in the news when he was detained by security at the Phoenix Sky Harbor International Airport. He was scheduled to deliver an address at the National Rifle Association and speak to a class at the United States Military Academy at West Point. A search necessitated by his pacemaker precluding a metal detector screening had led to the discovery of the star-shaped Medal of Honor, along with a clearly marked dummy-bullet keychain, a second replica bullet and a small nail file (with MOH insignia).

The incident caused a furor with both media and public support given to Foss. Newsman Jack Cafferty noted that airport security personnel demonstrated poor judgment in not recognizing the Medal of Honor and in demanding to confiscate and destroy the medal and related memorabilia. He eventually lost a souvenir replica bullet, but was able to retain his Medal of Honor and commemorative nail file, by shipping it back to himself.

"I wasn't upset for me ... I was upset for the Medal of Honor, that they just didn't know what it even was. It represents all of the guys who lost their lives – the guys who never came back. Everyone who put their lives on the line for their country. You're supposed to know what the Medal of Honor is", he said. The incident led to a national debate about post 9/11 airport security practices and their ramifications on the average citizen.

Death
Foss suffered a stroke in October 2002 when he bled from a cerebral aneurysm. He died three months later on New Year's Day, 2003, never having regained consciousness, in Scottsdale, Arizona, where he and his wife had made their home in later years. Vice President Dick Cheney, retired Colonel Oliver North and South Dakota native and NBC News anchor Tom Brokaw were among those who attended with North delivering the eulogy.

Actor Charlton Heston gave a brief tribute to his old friend. Foss was buried at Arlington National Cemetery in Section 7A, Lot 162 on January 21, 2003. Family, friends, military personnel and dignitaries remembered him fondly at a service in Arlington and at an earlier "Memorial Service for an American Patriot" in the old chapel at nearby Fort Myer.

Memorials
A number of institutions and locations have been named in honor of Foss, including Marine Corps Air Station Miramar Joe Foss Field, the Joe Foss Field Air National Guard Station in Sioux Falls, South Dakota, the Joe Foss Field at the Sioux Falls Regional Airport  , Joe Foss High School also in Sioux Falls, and the State Building in Pierre, South Dakota. A larger-than-life bronze statue of Foss stands in the lobby of the Sioux Falls Regional Airport.

The Joe Foss Shooting Complex in Buckeye, Arizona, is also named in his honor. A private road in Scottsdale, Arizona, owned by General Dynamics, was renamed "Joe Foss Way" and dedicated on May 20, 2003.

In 1984, Foss was inducted into the National Aviation Hall of Fame in Dayton, Ohio. 

Foss was inducted into the Naval Aviation Hall of Honor at the National Naval Aviation Museum in Pensacola, Florida, in 1994.

Aerial victories

The Marine Corps credits Foss with 26 air victories, and Marine ace Robert M. Hanson with 25 victories. However, the Marine Corps credits Marine ace Gregory "Pappy" Boyington with 28 American victories. This is due to Boyington's (22 Marine victories) wartime claim of 6 victories scored while serving with the Flying Tigers (American Volunteer Group-AVG) in China at the beginning of World War II, prior to him rejoining the Marine Corps;

AVG records show that Boyington was paid for 3.5 enemy aircraft destroyed (2-air, 1.5-ground). The American Fighter Aces Association credits Boyington with 24 victories (22 with the Marine Corps and 2 with the AVG).

Military awards
Foss's military decorations and awards include:

Medal of Honor citation

See also
 List of Medal of Honor recipients for World War II
 American Football League players, coaches and contributors

References

Notes

Citations

Bibliography

 Bauer, Daniel. "Joe Foss: American Hero (Part One)." Air Classics, Volume 26, Number 1, January 1990.
 Bauer, Daniel. "Joe Foss: American Hero (Part Two)." Air Classics, Volume 26, Number 3, March 1990.
 Bauer, Daniel. "Joe Foss: American Hero (Part Three)." Air Classics, Volume 26, Number 5, May 1990.
 "Brigadier General Joseph Jacob Foss, ANG." Who's Who in Marine Corps History.
 Brokaw, Tom. The Greatest Generation. New York: Random House, 1998. .
  United States Marine Corps
 Foss, Joe. A Proud American: The Autobiography of Joe Foss. New York: Presidio Press, 2002. .
 Gurney, Gene. Five Down & Glory. New York: Ballantine Books, 1982, First edition 1965. .
 Jackson, Robert. Fighter Aces of World War II: The True Stories of Fourteen of World War II's Fighter Pilots: London: Corgi Books, 1978. .
 Loomis, Robert D. Great American Fighter Pilots of World War II. New York: Random House, 1961. .
 Miller, Thomas G. Jr. The Cactus Air Force. New York: Ballantine Books, 1969. .
 Shores, Christopher. Fighter Aces. London: Hamlyn Publishing, 1975. .
 Sims, Edward H. Greatest Fighter Missions of the top Navy and Marine aces of World War II. New York: Ballantine Books, 1969, First edition 1962. .
 Smith, Larry. Beyond Glory: Medal of Honor Heroes in Their Own Words. New York: W. W. Norton & Company, 2004, First edition 2003. .
 Tillman, Barrett. Wildcat Aces of World War 2 (Aircraft of the Aces). Oxford, UK: Osprey, 1995. .
 Yenne, Bill. Aces High: The Heroic Saga of the Two Top-Scoring American Aces of World War II. New York: Berkley, 2009. .
 Zimmerman, Dwight Jon and John D. Gresham. Uncommon Valor: The Medal of Honor and the Six Warriors Who Earned It in Afghanistan and Iraq. New York: St. Martin's Press, 2010. .

Further reading

External links
 Joseph Foss – C.O. VMF-121
 Joseph J. Foss
 Joe Foss Institute
 South Dakota Air National Guard website
 Joe J. Foss, Medal of Honor – Joe Foss estate artifacts restored, preserved and displayed at Historical Registry
 
 Arlington National Cemetery
 

1915 births
2003 deaths
20th-century American politicians
American broadcasters
American Football League contributors
American gun rights activists
American people of Norwegian descent
American people of Scottish descent
American World War II flying aces
Aviators from South Dakota
Burials at Arlington National Cemetery
Republican Party governors of South Dakota
Republican Party members of the South Dakota House of Representatives
People from Sioux Falls, South Dakota
Presidents of the National Rifle Association
Recipients of the Distinguished Flying Cross (United States)
Sons of the American Revolution
United States Air Force generals
United States Marine Corps Medal of Honor recipients
United States Marine Corps officers
United States Marine Corps pilots of World War II
United States Naval Aviators
World War II recipients of the Medal of Honor
Recipients of the Air Medal